Samet is both a surname and a given name. The name is German and Jewish (Ashkenazic): metonymic occupational name for a maker or seller of velvet, from Yiddish samet 'velvet' (German Samt, ultimately from Greek hexamiton, a compound of hex 'six' + mitos 'thread'). 

Notable people with the name include:

Given name
Samet Ağaoğlu (1909–1982), Turkish politician
Samet Ak (born 2001), Turkish archer
Samet Akaydın (born 1994), Turkish football player
Samet Aybaba (born 1955), Turkish football player
Samet Ashimov (born 1979), Bulgarian football player
Samet Bulut (born 1996), Dutch football player
Samet Bülbül (born 1991),  Turkish football player
Samet Geyik (born 1987), Turkish basketball player
Samet Gündüz (born 1987), Swiss football player
Samet Ruqi (born 1995), Albanian football player
Samet Hasan Yıldıran (born 1992), Turkish football player

Middle name
Faik Samet Güneş (born 1993), Turkish volleyball player.

Surname
Elizabeth Samet (born 1969), American author 
Hanan Samet, computer scientist
Jonathan Samet (born 1946), physician and epidemiologist
Judah Samet (born 1938), American businessman
Kayna Samet (born 1980), French singer
Sherwood Samet (born 1927), American gynecologist

References

Turkish-language surnames
Turkish masculine given names